Tumen (Chosŏn'gŭl: 도문; Hangul: 투먼) is a county-level city in Yanbian Korean Autonomous Prefecture, eastern Jilin province, Northeast China.  Of its 136,000 inhabitants, approximately 78,000 (or 57%) are of Korean descent. The two official languages are Chinese and Korean. Tumen is separated from Namyang of North Hamgyong province of North Korea by the Tumen River.  Due to this proximity, many North Koreans escaping North Korea pass through Tumen. Tumen is also the location of a large detention center for captured North Koreans awaiting deportation. Tumen has two major food markets, the South Market and the North Market, where most of the residents purchase their food. Packaged foods and meats are usually sold inside the building, and vegetables are sold outside. There are six elementary schools, with three Korean schools, and three Chinese schools.

A riverfront promenade in the city has restaurants where patrons can gaze across the river into North Korea.

Administrative divisions

Tumen has three subdistricts and four towns.

Subdistricts:
Xiangshang Subdistrict (向上街道 / 향상가도), Xinhua Subdistrict (新华街道 / 신화가도), Yuegong Subdistrict (月宫街道 / 월궁가도)

Towns:
Yueqing (月晴镇 / 월청진), Shixian (石峴镇 / 석현진), Chang'an (长安镇 / 장안진), Liangshui (凉水镇 / 양수진)

Climate

See also

 Tumen Border Bridge

References

External links 

Official site 

Cities in Yanbian
County-level divisions of Jilin